Dichloroethane can refer to either of two isomeric organochlorides with the molecular formula C2H4Cl2:

 1,1-Dichloroethane (ethylidene chloride)
 1,2-Dichloroethane (ethylene dichloride)

See also
Dichloroethene
Difluoroethane

de:Dichlorethan
ru:Дихлорэтан